Zabad may refer to:

 Zabad (Bible), several figures in the Bible
 Zabad, Iran, a village in Qazvin Province, Iran
 Zabad, Syria, a village